The 2001–02 Football Conference season was the twenty-third season of the Football Conference, also known as the Nationwide Conference for sponsorship reasons.

Changes since the previous season
 Barnet (relegated from the Football League 2000–01)
 Farnborough Town (promoted 2000–01)
 Margate (promoted 2000–01)
 Stalybridge Celtic (promoted 2000–01)

Overview
The manager of Boston United, Steve Evans, and former chairman, Pat Malkinson, were charged with breaking the Football Association's rules over the registration of players. Both men received bans from the FA, and the club were fined and docked four points from their first season in the League. This angered some, especially the Conference runners up Dagenham & Redbridge, who believed that any points deduction should have applied to the previous season, which would have meant Dagenham being promoted instead.

Locations

Final  league table

Results

Top scorers in order of league goals

 Footballtransfers.co.uk, thefootballarchives.com and Soccerbase contain information on many playerson whom there is not yet an article in Wikipedia.
 Source:

References

External links
 Official Football Conference Website
 2001–02 Conference National Results

 
National League (English football) seasons
5
English